U with ogonek (majuscule: Ų, minuscule: ų) is a letter of the Latin alphabet formed by addition of the ogonek to the letter U. It is used in Lithuanian, Chipewyan, Dadibi, Dalecarlian, Gwichʼin, Hän, Iñapari, Kaska, Sierra Otomi, Sekani, Tagish, Tlingit, Tutchone, Winnebago, and Ixtlán Zapotec.

Usage 
In Lithuanian, it is the 28th letter of the alphabet, and is pronounced as long close back rounded vowel ([uː]). In the past, the letter was used to denote the nasalized close back rounded vowel ([ũ]). Currently, it appears in the words that used to be nasalized in the past, for example in siųsti, which means send.

The letter also appears in various Indigenous languages of North America, which are: Chipewyan, Dadibi, Dalecarlian, Gwichʼin, Hän, Iñapari, Kaska, Sierra Otomi, Sekani, Tagish, Tlingit, Tutchone, Winnebago, and Ixtlán Zapotec. In most of them, the letter represent the nasalized close back rounded vowel ([ũ]).

Encoding

References 

Latin letters with diacritics